was a   after Chōhō and before Chōwa. This period spanned the years from July 1004 through December 1012.

Change of Era
 1004 :  The era name was changed to mark an event or series of events. The previous era ended and a new one commenced in Kankō 6, on the 20th day of the 7th month of 1004.

Events of the Kankō Era
 March 17, 1008 (Kankō 5, 8th day of the 2nd month): The former-Emperor Kazan died at the age of 41.
 July 16, 1011 (Kankō 8, 13th day of the 6th month): In the 5th year of Emperor Ichijō's reign (一条天皇5年), he abdicated; and the succession (‘‘senso’’) was received by his cousin.  Shortly thereafter, Emperor Sanjō is said to have acceded to the throne (‘‘sokui’’).
 July 15, 1011 (Kankō 8, 22nd day of the 6th month ): Daijō-tennō Ichijō died at the age of 32. 
 November 21, 1011 (Kankō 8, 24th day of the 10th month):  Daijō-tennō Reizei, who was Emperor Sanjō's father, died at age 62.

Notes

References
 Brown, Delmer M. and Ichirō Ishida, eds. (1979).  Gukanshō: The Future and the Past. Berkeley: University of California Press. ;  OCLC 251325323
 Nussbaum, Louis-Frédéric and Käthe Roth. (2005).  Japan encyclopedia. Cambridge: Harvard University Press. ;  OCLC 58053128
 Titsingh, Isaac. (1834). Nihon Odai Ichiran; ou,  Annales des empereurs du Japon.  Paris: Royal Asiatic Society, Oriental Translation Fund of Great Britain and Ireland. OCLC 5850691
 Varley, H. Paul. (1980). A Chronicle of Gods and Sovereigns: Jinnō Shōtōki of Kitabatake Chikafusa. New York: Columbia University Press. ;  OCLC 6042764

External links
 National Diet Library, "The Japanese Calendar" -- historical overview plus illustrative images from library's collection

Japanese eras